WSCS is a Classical formatted broadcast radio station.  The station is licensed to New London, New Hampshire and serves New London, Andover and the Lake Sunapee Region in New Hampshire.  WSCS is owned by Sugar River Media and operated under their Sugar River Foundation, Inc. licensee.

History
WSCS was formerly owned by Colby-Sawyer College, WSCS was sold to the Vinikoor Family Foundation, Inc. on September 1, 2014, for $4,000.  At the time, The Vinikoor Family Foundation also owned now-sister stations WNTK-FM and WCVR.  As part of a deal announced October 5, 2016, The Vinikoor Family Foundation sold WSCS to Sugar River Foundation, Inc. for $10,000 and its current sister stations to Sugar River Media for $1.95 million on the same date.

References

External links
 Classical 90.9 WSCS Online
 

1996 establishments in New Hampshire
Radio stations established in 1996
SCS